The following lists events that happened during 2020 in Niue.

Incumbents 

 Monarch: Elizabeth II
 Premier: Toke Talagi (until 11 June) Dalton Tagelagi (from 11 June)
 Speakers of the Assembly: Togiavalu Pihigia (until 10 June) Hima Douglas (from 11 June)

Events 
Ongoing – COVID-19 pandemic in Oceania

 3 April – Even though no cases were reported in the territory, the government banned visitors from countries highly affected by the COVID-19 pandemic.
 30 May – Premier Toke Talagi, in office for twelve years, lost his seat in general elections were held in the country.

Deaths 

 15 July – Toke Talagi, former Premier (born 1951)

References 

2020 in Niue
2020s in Niue
Years of the 21st century in Niue
Niue